Barnhills Tower was a 16th century tower house about  west of Jedburgh in the  Scottish Borders, Scotland, north of the River Teviot, on the high left bank of the Craigend Burn.

History
The Turnbulls owned the property, which was burnt by the English in 1545, by the  Earl of Hertford, during the Rough Wooing, but it was still one of the houses appointed to watch the fords of the River Tweed in 1548-9.

Older renderings of the castle name are “Barne helles” and “Barnehyll”.

Structure
All that remains of the castle is the vaulted basement, and trace of a stair in a corner  The tower is oblong, built of rubble, mainly freestone. The surviving windows have chamfered freestone dressings.

The entrance was in the east wall, with three steps beyond leading down to the ground floor.  A staircase ran southward in the thickness of the wall towards the south east angle, and there are traces of this.

References

Castles in the Scottish Borders